α-Ethyltryptamine (αET, AET), also known as etryptamine (INN, BAN, USAN), is a psychedelic, stimulant, and entactogenic drug of the tryptamine class. It was originally developed and marketed as an antidepressant under the brand name Monase by Upjohn in the 1960s.

History 
Originally believed to exert its effects predominantly via monoamine oxidase inhibition, alpha-ethyltryptamine was developed during the 1960s as an antidepressant by Upjohn chemical company in the United States under the name Monase, but was withdrawn from potential commercial use due to incidence of idiosyncratic agranulocytosis.

α-ET gained limited recreational popularity as a designer drug in the 1980s. Subsequently, in the USA it was added to the Schedule I list of illegal substances in 1993.

Pharmacology 
αET is structurally and pharmacologically related to αMT, α-methyltryptamine, and it is believed its central stimulant activity is probably not due to its activity as an MAOI, but appears to stem from its structural relationship to the indolic psychedelics. In contrast to αMT, αET is less stimulating and hallucinogenic, its effects resembling more those of entactogens like MDMA ("Ecstasy").

Similarly to α-MT, α-ET is a releasing agent of serotonin, norepinephrine and dopamine, with serotonin being the primary neurotransmitter affected. In addition, it acts as a non-selective serotonin receptor agonist. A study performed in 1991 with rat subjects provided evidence that a-ET may induce serotonergic neurotoxicity similar to that of MDMA. As with many other serotonin releasing agents, injury can occur when excessive doses are taken or when combined with drugs such as other MAOIs.

References

External links 
 TiHKAL entry
 αET Entry in TiHKAL • info
 Erowid page on αET

Antidepressants
Psychedelic tryptamines
Entactogens and empathogens
Monoamine oxidase inhibitors
Designer drugs
Serotonin-norepinephrine-dopamine releasing agents
Serotonin receptor agonists
Withdrawn drugs